Bánovce nad Ondavou is a village and municipality in Michalovce District in the Kosice Region of eastern Slovakia.

History
In historical records the village was first mentioned in 1326.

Geography
The village lies at an altitude of 122 metres and covers an area of  (2020-06-30/-07-01).

Ethnicity
The population is 96% Slovak in ethnicity.

Population 
It has a population of 715 people (2020-12-31).

Government
The village relies on the tax and district offices, and fire brigade at Michalovce and relies on the police force and birth registry at Trhovište.

Economy
The village has a post office, and a food store.

Sports
The village has a football pitch.

Transport
The village has a railway station.

Genealogical resources
The records for genealogical research are available at the state archive "Statny Archiv in Presov, Slovakia"

 Roman Catholic church records (births/marriages/deaths): 1790-1895(parish B)
 Greek Catholic church records (births/marriages/deaths): 1804-1923(parish B)
 Lutheran church records (births/marriages/deaths): 1783-1895(parish B)
 Reformed church records (births/marriages/deaths): 1797-1895(parish A)

Gallery

See also
 List of municipalities and towns in Michalovce District
 List of municipalities and towns in Slovakia

References

External links

https://web.archive.org/web/20071116010355/http://www.statistics.sk/mosmis/eng/run.html
http://www.banovcenadondavou.sk/
Surnames of living people in Banovce nad Ondavou

Villages and municipalities in Michalovce District
Zemplín (region)